Pistol Pete: The Life and Times of Pete Maravich is a documentary of "Pistol" Pete Maravich. It first aired on CBS during the Final Four Tournament on April 1, 2001. It was produced by George Roy, written by Steven Stern, and narrated by Harry Connick, Jr. It is considered the most comprehensive documentary about Maravich ever produced.tage, plus a host of rare interviews, including Julius Erving, Les Robinson, and the camera-shy Jackie Maravich. Maravich biographer Wayne Federman is interviewed throughout and also served as a film consultant.

External links

Pistol Pete: The Life and Times of Pete Maravich at Yahoo TV

American basketball films
Documentary films about basketball
CBS network films
College basketball mass media in the United States
2001 television films
2001 films
2000s American films